Mark Wilson may refer to:

Arts and entertainment
 Mark Wilson (artist) (born 1943), American digital artist, painter, and printmaker
 Mark Wilson (comedian), Canadian Second City alumnus
 Mark Wilson (dancer) (born 1962), Australian dancer and entertainer
 Mark Wilson (journalist and musician) (born 1969), FOX 13 Tampa news anchor and Emmy award winner
 Mark Wilson (magician) (1929–2021), American magician and magic consultant
 Mark Wilson (musician) (born 1980), Australian bass guitarist

Sports
 Mark Wilson (American football) (born 1980), American football offensive tackle
 Mark Wilson (darts player) (born 1977), English darts player
 Mark Wilson (English footballer) (born 1979), English football midfielder
 Mark Wilson (golfer) (born 1974), American golfer
 Mark Wilson (rugby union) (born 1989), rugby union player for Newcastle Falcons
 Mark Wilson (Scottish footballer) (born 1984), Scottish footballer
 Mark Wilson (bowls) (born 1984), Northern Irish lawn bowler
 Mark Wilson (cricketer) (1890–1982), Scottish cricketer

Others
 Mark Alan Wilson (1953–2005), American murder victim
 Mark Wilson (businessman) (born 1966), former CEO of Aviva
 Mark Wilson (judge) (1896–1956), Irish-born British colonial judge
 Mark Wilson (philosopher) (born 1947), American philosopher
 Mark Wilson (politician), American politician from Washington State
 Mark Wilson (priest) (born 1946), Archdeacon of Dorking

See also
 Marc Wilson (disambiguation)